Sajjapur is a village in Kohir Mandal in Medak district, Telangana state, India.

References

Villages in Medak district